Fernando Antonio Saavedra Valencia (born in 1986) is a Chilean footballer. He began his career at Club Deportes La Serena and is currently playing for Everton.

Between 2006 and 2007, he played for Quilmes of the Primera División Argentina.

Honors

Club
Everton
 Primera División de Chile (1): 2008 Apertura

Unión La Calera
 Primera B de Chile (1): 2017 Transición

References

External links
 BDFA profile
 Argentine Primera statistics at Futbol XXI

1976 births
Living people
People from Petorca Province
Chilean footballers
Chilean expatriate footballers
Deportes La Serena footballers
Quilmes Atlético Club footballers
Everton de Viña del Mar footballers
Unión San Felipe footballers
San Luis de Quillota footballers
Unión La Calera footballers
Deportes Temuco footballers
Primera B de Chile players
Chilean Primera División players
Argentine Primera División players
Chilean expatriate sportspeople in Argentina
Expatriate footballers in Argentina
Association football midfielders